Brachychiton maximowiczii is a species of Brachychiton found in Queensland, Australia.

References

External links
 

maximowiczii